Yanka Kupala State University of Grodno is а higher education institution located in Grodno. It is the largest regional higher education institution in the Republic of Belarus, university complex integrating all levels of education.

According to the international Webometrics ranking  (July 2011), YKSUG ranks second among Belarusian universities and 3103 among 12 000 world universities.

It is the second (after BSU) education institution in the Republic of Belarus where the system of electronic student identification card was introduced.

University Rectors 
 Samuił Raskin (1940)
 Dziamiencij Kardaš (1940-1941)
 Mikałaj Ułasaviec (1944-1949)
 Josif Malukievič (1949-1955)
 Dźmitry Markoŭski (1955-1973)
 Alaksandar Badakoŭ (1973-1994)
 Leanid Kivač (1994-1997)
 Siarhiej Maskievič (1997-2005)
 Jaŭhien Roŭba (2005-2013)
 Andrej Karol (2013-2017)
 Iryna Kiturka (since 2017)

History 

On February 22, 1940, by the decision of the Council of People's Commissars of the BSSR Teachers' Training Institute was founded in Grodno. It ceased its development because of the German-Soviet War. Already in 1944 the studies continued, and the Teachers' Institute was reorganized into a pedagogical (with three Faculties – Physics and Mathematics, Faculty of Literature and Foreign languages Faculty). In 1957 the institute was honored with the name of Janka Kupała. In 1967 the first defence of doctoral thesis took place in the institute, and in 1969 postgraduate studies were introduced. On May 1, 1978, Pedagogical Institute was reorganized into the Janka Kupała State University of Grodno.

In 2011, it was the first university, among higher education institutions of the country, which became the winner of the national contest "Prize of the Government of the Republic of Belarus for achievements in quality".

In 2011, the Janka Kupała State University of Grodno received the status of scientific organization.

In 2010, the Janka Kupała University was the first university, among  the regional universities of Belarus, which received national and international certificates of quality management system meeting the requirements of STB ISO 9001-2009 and ISO 9001:2008 (series of standards ISO 9000)

The University today 
At present, there are: 17 098 students, 284 master students, 162 post-graduate students, 40 professors, 261 associate professors and 316 candidates of sciences. The university comprises 17 faculties and 79 departments. The university research library has more than 700 000 books.

Faculties 
 Faculty of Biology and Ecology
 Military Faculty
 Faculty of Arts and Design
 Faculty of History and Sociology
 Faculty of Mathematics and Information Science
 Faculty of Pedagogy
 Faculty of Psychology
 Faculty of Tourism and Service
 Faculty of Physics and Engineering
 Faculty of Physical Training
 Faculty of Philology
 Faculty of Economics and Management
 Faculty of Law
 Faculty of Engineering and Construction
 Faculty of Innovative Mechanic Engineering
 Association of Socio-Humanitarian Departments
 Faculty of Professional skills upgrading and retraining «School of Tourism and Hospitality»

In addition, the university comprises the Regional Centre for Testing and Youth Career Orientation, the Institute for Professional Skills Upgrading and Retraining and colleges:
 Vaŭkavysk College
 Humanitarian College
 Technological college
 Lida College

Logotype of the university and faculties 
The logotype of the university and faculties is a stylized letter “У” of the Cyrillic alphabet with certain symbols in the centre.

Alumni 
 Danuta Bičel-Zahnietava - poet
 Ivan Cichan - athlete
 Alaksiej Karpiuk - writer
 Volha Korbut – gymnast
 Ivan Lepiešaŭ - linguist
 Alaksandar Milinkievič – politician
 Michas Tkačoŭ - historian
 Vadzim Sarančukoŭ - politician, a member of  BPF in Grodno

See also 
 Mikola Silčanka — former professor

Photos

References

External links 

  

1940 establishments in Belarus
Buildings and structures in Grodno Region
Educational institutions established in 1940
Grodno
Public universities
Universities in Belarus